O Pátio das Cantigas (in English, The Courtyard of Songs) is a Portuguese film from 1942, directed by Francisco Ribeiro, "Ribeirinho", that takes place in a typical Lisbon neighbourhood during the Popular Saints festivals, through a maze of misunderstandings and innuendos, with Vasco Santana, António Silva, Laura Alves and Ribeiro.

The film also stars António Silva, António Vilar, Armando Chagas, Barroso Lopes, Carlos Alves, Carlos Otero, Eliezer Kamenesky, Francisco de Castro, Graça Maria, Maria da Graça and Maria das Neves.

One of the most beloved comedies of the comédia à portuguesa, O Pátio das Cantigas represents the convergence of top talent of the time, most notably Ribeirinho who directed, his brother, António Lopes Ribeiro who produced and, joining both brothers on the writing credits, Vasco Santana. It was the first these three stars worked together and also the only film directed by Ribeirinho.

The script is based upon a set game of witty dialogues rife with innuendo and "double entendres", that admirably captured the atmosphere of a Lisbon neighbourhood and popular through the Saints celebrations, from a set of archetypical characters, meddling in their quarrels, confrontations and ambitions.

Plot
In a typical Lisbon "pátio", or courtyard, by the Popular Saints festivals, a handful of plain people live their day-to-day, their dreams, disappointments, passions, jealousies and joys in an almost enchanted atmosphere. Alfredo is a good lad whose brother Carlos, flirts with frivolous Amália. Her sister, Suzana, is in turn in love with Alfredo. Narciso, Rufino's father and his partner in the neighbourhoods café, is a chronic drunkard and a guitar virtuoso. Rosa, a merry widow that sells flowers, is in turn courted by Narciso and by the unpleasant and arrogant Evaristo, the grocer, father to envious and spoiled Celeste. The rivalry between Narciso and Evaristo reaches its height in a dance night at the courtyard that ends in a veritable camp battle. At long last all is settled between the several loving couples and life goes on serenely in the courtyard.

Popular culture
Some gags became household references, the teasing of António Silva with "Evaristo, tens cá disto?".

References
 O Pátio das Cantigas at Amor de Perdição.

External links 
 

1940s Portuguese-language films
Portuguese black-and-white films
1942 films
Films directed by Francisco Ribeiro
Portuguese musical comedy films
1942 musical comedy films